The 1900 Holy Cross football team was an American football team that represented the College of the Holy Cross as an independent in the 1900 college football season.

In their third year under head coach Maurice Connor, the team compiled a 4–4–1 record. W. C. T. O'Sullivan was the team captain.

The Holy Cross Football Fact Book shows a 5–3–1 record for 1900, but the results table does not match contemporary press reports, with the Andover, Colby and Wesleyan games given the wrong dates, and a win over Worcester Academy shown instead of the loss to Williams.

Holy Cross played its home games at two off-campus fields in Worcester, Massachusetts, the Worcester Oval and the Worcester College Grounds.

Schedule

References

Holy Cross
Holy Cross Crusaders football seasons
Holy Cross football